James Browne may refer to:

James Browne (athlete) (born 1966), Antiguan athlete
James Browne (pirate) (died 1677), Scottish pirate active in the Caribbean
James Browne (bishop of Kilmore) (died 1865), Irish Roman Catholic bishop
James Browne (bishop of Ferns) (1842–1917), Irish Roman Catholic bishop
James Browne (Indian Army officer) (1839–1896), Anglo-Indian engineer and administrator
James Browne (1793–1854) (1793–1854), Member of Parliament for Mayo, 1818–1831
James Browne (writer) (1793–1841), Scottish man of letters
Jim Browne (1930–2003), American basketball player
James Crichton-Browne (1840–1938), British psychiatrist
James Howard Browne (1919–2004), Australian amateur botanist and plant photographer
James Browne (theologian) (1616–1685), English theologian
James Browne (died 1790) (1737–1790), Member of the Parliament of Ireland for Jamestown 1768–76, for Tuam 1776–83, and for Castlebar 1783–90
James Browne, 2nd Baron Kilmaine (1765–1825), Irish peer, Member of the Parliament of Ireland for Carlow Borough 1790
James J. Browne, president of NUI Galway
James Browne (Fianna Fáil politician) (born 1975), Irish Fianna Fáil politician, TD for Wexford 2016—
James Browne (priest) (fl. 1867–1894), Archdeacon of Madras
James C. Browne (1935–2018), American computer scientist
James Frankwort Manners Browne (1823–1910), Anglo-Irish officer in the British Army

See also
James Brown (disambiguation)